Tony Loranzo Jeffery (born July 9, 1964) is a former American football running back who played two seasons with the Phoenix Cardinals of the National Football League. He was drafted by the Phoenix Cardinals in the second round of the 1988 NFL Draft. He played college football at Texas Christian University and attended Gladewater High School in Gladewater, Texas. Jeffery was also a member of the New York/New Jersey Knights of the World League of American Football.

References

External links
Just Sports Stats
College stats

Living people
1964 births
Players of American football from Texas
American football running backs
African-American players of American football
TCU Horned Frogs football players
Phoenix Cardinals players
New York/New Jersey Knights players
People from Gladewater, Texas
21st-century African-American people
20th-century African-American sportspeople